White Plains is an unincorporated community located in Brunswick County, in the U.S. state of Virginia.

Brick House was listed on the National Register of Historic Places in 1982.

References

Unincorporated communities in Virginia
Unincorporated communities in Brunswick County, Virginia